Devoucoux is a manufacturer of luxury horse saddles. The company produces over 3,700 unique saddles, based on 17 basic models. World class riders, including Olympic Medallist Norman Dello Joio, Karin Donckers, Ron George, and Sara Algotsson use Devoucoux saddles. 

Devoucoux sponsors riders including Thomas Carlile, Gilles Pons, Rodolphe Scherer, Stanislas de Zuchovitch, Pippa Funnell, Dani Evans, and Jennie Brannigan.

Devoucoux also sponsors elite competitors and contests.  Devoucoux was the sponsor of the $30,000 Otter Creek Grand Prix, a show jumping competition held over a five-week period at the 2006 Vermont Summer Festival. They were also a sponsor of the $25,000 Devoucoux Wild Card Grand Prix, HITS Culpeper, Virginia.

History
The company was started in 1985 by Jean-Michel Devoucoux in his workshop in the Basque village of Sare. The founder is an ex-apprentice groom from Ciboure in the Pyrénées Atlantiques and is trained to make both harnesses and saddles. The company now has sixty employees. 

The initial US product line was launched in 1999.

In 2007, Director Brice Goguet was replaced by Benjamin Auzimour for United States operations, and Didier Brailly took over in the UK.

In 2008, the company supported the British Horse Society, by offering a saddle as a prize to new members.

References

External links
 Official site
 California Riding Magazine: Review
 Horse Tack Review:Devoucoux Chiberta Jumping Saddles
 Used Devoucoux Saddle website
 Review: Devoucoux Milady Dressage Saddles
 Review: Devoucoux Makila Dressage Saddles (1)
 Review: Devoucoux Makila Dressage Saddles (2)
 Review: Devoucoux Makila Dressage Saddles (3)
 Review: Devoucoux Mendia Dressage Saddles
 Review: Devoucoux Biarritz Dressage Saddles

Saddle manufacturers
Manufacturing companies of France
Sporting goods manufacturers of France